Ilex maingayi is a species of plant in the family Aquifoliaceae. It is endemic to Peninsular Malaysia.  It is threatened by habitat loss.

References

maingayi
Endemic flora of Peninsular Malaysia
Taxonomy articles created by Polbot
Taxa named by Joseph Dalton Hooker